Tangos, the Exile of Gardel is an Argentine-French film released on 20 March 1986, directed by Fernando Solanas, starring Marie Laforêt, Miguel Ángel Solá and Philippe Leotard. The film was selected as the Argentine entry for the Best Foreign Language Film at the 59th Academy Awards, but was not accepted as a nominee.

It tells the story of a group of people who left Argentina because of the military dictatorship of 1976-1983 and emigrated to Paris. The group decides to stage a tango ballet in honour of singer and composer Carlos Gardel.

In a survey of the 100 greatest films of Argentine cinema carried out by the Museo del Cine Pablo Ducrós Hicken in 2000, the film reached the 15th position. In a new version of the survey organized in 2022 by the specialized magazines La vida útil, Taipei and La tierra quema, presented at the Mar del Plata International Film Festival, the film reached the 47th position.

Cast 
 Marie Laforêt (Mariana)
 Miguel Ángel Solá (Juan Dos)
 Philippe Leotard (Pierre)
 Marina Vlady (Florence)
 Georges Wilson (Jean Marie)
 Lautaro Murúa (Gerardo)
 Ana María Picchio (Ana)
 Gabriela Toscano
 Michel Etcheverry (San Martín)
 Claude Melki (El Ángel)
 Gregorio Manzur (Carlos Gardel)
 Leonor Galindo
 Eduardo Pavlovsky
 Jorge Six
 Guillermo Núñez
 Mirtha CaMedeiros
 Guillermo Angelelli
 Fernando Solanas (Enrique Santos Discépolo)

Awards 
 1985, Gran Premio Speciale - Venice Film Festival
 1985, Gran Coral (First Prize) - Havana Film Festival
 1986, César Award, France (best music)
 1987, Silver Condor Award for Best Film - Argentine Film Critics Association

See also
 List of submissions to the 59th Academy Awards for Best Foreign Language Film
 List of Argentine submissions for the Academy Award for Best Foreign Language Film

References

External links 
  Tangos, el exilio de Gardel o la revolución estética de Fernando Solanas, by Cécile François (University of Orléans)
  Tangos, the Exile of Gardel at Argentinafilms.com
  

1985 films
French musical drama films
1980s Spanish-language films
Tango films
Venice Grand Jury Prize winners
1980s French films
1980s Argentine films
Argentine musical drama films